Clifford Mitchell Walker (July 4, 1877 – November 9, 1954) was an American attorney and politician from the U.S. state of Georgia.

A graduate of the University of Georgia in 1897, he was a member of the Sigma Alpha Epsilon fraternity.

Walker served consecutive two-year terms as the 64th Governor of Georgia as a Democrat from 1923 to 1927, after winning with the support of the Ku Klux Klan. Walker made few legislative advances during his term as governor, and is largely remembered for his membership in the KKK and his inclusion of KKK leadership in policy matters throughout his term.  His additional political service included the office of Mayor of Monroe, Georgia.

Before his gubernatorial terms, Walker served as the state attorney general from 1915 to 1920. He also was a co-founder of the Woodrow Wilson College of Law in Atlanta, Georgia. Walker made the first appointment of a poet laureate of the U.S. state of Georgia, that being Frank Lebby Stanton in 1925.

He was born in Monroe in 1877. Walker died at his home in Monroe in 1954 and was buried in the Old Baptist Cemetery in that same city.

Notes

References
 Georgia State Archives Roster of State Governors
 Georgia Governor's Gravesites Field Guide (1776–2003)

1877 births
1954 deaths
Democratic Party governors of Georgia (U.S. state)
Georgia (U.S. state) Attorneys General
Mayors of places in Georgia (U.S. state)
University of Georgia alumni
American Ku Klux Klan members